Puteri Indonesia 2014, the 18th Annual Puteri Indonesia beauty pageant, was held in Jakarta Convention Center, Jakarta, Indonesia on January 29, 2014. Thirty eight contestants from all 33 provinces of Indonesia competed for the title of Puteri Indonesia, one of the most prominent beauty pageant titles in the country.

Whulandary Herman, Puteri Indonesia 2013 from West Sumatra crowned Elvira Devinamira from East Java successor at the end of this event. The winner will represent Indonesia at the Miss Universe 2014, while the runners-up will represent the nation at the Miss International 2014 and Miss Supranational 2014.

The winner of Miss Universe 2013 Gabriela Isler from Venezuela, was present during the event. The event was broadcast live on Indonesian television network, Indosiar.

Results
The Crowns of Puteri Indonesia Title Holders
 Puteri Indonesia 2014 (Miss Universe Indonesia 2014) 
 Puteri Indonesia Lingkungan 2014 (Miss International Indonesia 2014)
 Puteri Indonesia Pariwisata 2014 (Miss Supranational Indonesia 2014)

Contestants

References

External links 

 Official site
 Official Puteri Indonesia Official Website
 Official Miss Universe Official Website
 Miss International Official Website
 Official Miss Supranational Official Website

2014 beauty pageants
2014